Katya Paskaleva was a Bulgarian film and stage actress, born in 1945, deceased in 2002.

She is best known for her performance as Maria in the Bulgarian film classic The Goat Horn (1972), for which she received broad critical acclaim. Paskaleva is also known for her roles in the films The End of the Song (1971), Villa Zone (1975), Matriarchy (1977), Elegy (1982), Eve on the Third Floor (1987) as well as her numerous notable appearances on the stages of the Sofia Municipal Theatre and the Satirical Theatre "Aleko Konstantinov".

Biography and career 
Katya Paskaleva was born on September 18, 1945 in the town of Petrich, Bulgaria. In 1967, she graduated from The National Academy for Theatre and Film Arts where Metodi Andonov taught her acting. Her career started on the stage of the Pazardzhik Theatre before joining the troupe of the Sofia Municipal Theatre. In 1985, Paskaleva became part of the famous Satirical Theatre "Aleko Konstantinov" in Sofia. Her film debut was in the movie Monday Morning (1966), which was stopped by the communist authority and not released until 1988.

In 2002, Paskaleva died from cancer in Sofia.

Selected filmography

References

Sources

External links

1945 births
2002 deaths
Bulgarian film actresses
Bulgarian stage actresses
Bulgarian television actresses
People from Petrich
Macedonian Bulgarians
Burials at Central Sofia Cemetery
20th-century Bulgarian actresses
National Academy for Theatre and Film Arts alumni